Weeze Airport , less commonly known as Niederrhein Airport, is a minor international airport in the Lower Rhine region of Germany. It is used by Ryanair. Between 2008 and 2013, this was one of Germany's fastest-growing airports; however, the airport handled only 1.23 million passengers in 2019, reflecting a decline in throughput triggered by Ryanair reducing its route network.

History
The airport uses the facilities of the former military airbase RAF Laarbruch, and began operating as a civil airport in 2003. There is also a large fire department training facility on the airport grounds. Its IATA code is NRN because of its official name Flughafen Niederrhein. The airport has had several different names in its history as a civil airport. However, Ryanair still refers to it as "Düsseldorf-Weeze". The airport is actually closer to the Dutch cities of Venlo, Nijmegen and Arnhem, the German cities of Duisburg and Essen, and the immediate Weeze area than Düsseldorf.

Weeze was served by the short-lived, Dutch low-cost carrier V Bird, which opened a base here and operated flights to Berlin, Munich and several international destinations, from its inception in 2003 until bankruptcy in 2004. During this time, passenger numbers doubled from 200,000 to 400,000 within a year. In February 2014, Ryanair announced the cancellation of 18 routes from Weeze for the 2014 summer season citing a lack of aircraft.

In 2019, the airport faced severe financial difficulties due to a fall in passenger numbers by 30 percent over the previous year as a result of the cancellation of several Ryanair routes.

Facilities
Weeze Airport has one passenger terminal building with restaurants, shops, and check-in facilities. The apron, which is to the west of the terminal building, features nine aircraft stands for mid-sized aircraft such as the Boeing 737-800. As there are no jet bridges due to the location of the apron to the west side of the terminal building instead in front of it, bus-boarding is used for six stands. Only three stands are close enough to the terminal to be accessed on foot.

Airlines and destinations
The following airlines operate regular scheduled and seasonal flights at Weeze Airport:

Statistics

Ground transportation

Coach
Direct buses serve Düsseldorf Main Station up to 7 times a day; the journey taking 1h 15min. Airexpressbus offered from June 2007 until spring 2017 a service between Weeze Airport and Amsterdam with stops at Eindhoven Airport, Utrecht and 's-Hertogenbosch.

Train
Bus shuttles serve the railway stations of Weeze, Kevelaer and Goch on a frequent basis. Travellers for Düsseldorf Main Station will need to catch a bus or taxi to either Weeze or Kevelaer railway stations.

See also
 Transport in Germany
 List of airports in Germany

References

External links

 Official website
 
 

Weeze
Buildings and structures in Kleve (district)